Litva is a village in Belarus. It is located in the Baranavichy district, Brest Province, 120 km south-west of the capital Minsk.

External links 
 Location including the places

Villages in Belarus
Populated places in Brest Region